Asutifi North is one of the constituencies represented in the Parliament of Ghana. It elects one Member of Parliament (MP) by the first past the post system of election. Patrick Banor is the member of parliament for the constituency. He was elected on the ticket of the New Patriotic Party (NPP) and won a majority of 18,505 votes

See also
List of Ghana Parliament constituencies

References 

Parliamentary constituencies in Ahafo Region